Ali Fasir (born 4 September 1988) nicknamed "Sentey", is a Maldivian footballer who plays as a winger or striker for Club Valencia, which he captains, and the Maldives national team.

Fasir began his career at Club Eagles after being spotted by the club during their training camps. He played one season with the club and spent a year without a club until he was offered from Club All Youth Linkage. He played a major role to promote his side from second division to Dhivehi League. Fasir had an impressive Dhivehi League debut season and then signed for the most successful Dhivehi League team Club Valencia for the following season. In the 2011 season, Fasir signed for New Radiant and had a breakthrough year scoring 18 goals from 23 appearances. He was the league second top scorer (16 goals) with just one goal behind Victory's Ibrahim Fazeel. After the end of this remarkable season, Fasir signed with rivals Victory but had to stay away from football due to a fibula fracture during a national side practice session.

Fasir returned to New Radiant in November 2012. During his second spell at New Radiant, Fasir won a quadruple (all domestic competitions; Charity Shield, Dhivehi League, FA Cup and President's Cup) with a remarkable 100% winning record in 2013 season. He also played his first AFC Cup tournament, helping the club to reach the quarter-finals, having scored in the group stage, round of 16 and also in the quarter-finals. His displays for club and country led to him finish second in the Haveeru Maldivian Footballer of the year 2014, despite having to miss some of the important matches at the end of the season due to an injury. After recovering from injury, Fasir scored his first goal in a cup final, leading his side win the President's Cup with his goal. He scored 23 goals from 24 appearances for his club during the 2014 season.

Fasir represented Maldives at under-23 level in 2010, having called up for the 2010 South Asian Games and 2010 Asian Games. In the same year, he made his debut for the Maldives senior side in an exhibition game. He was part of the Maldives teams represented the SAFF Championship in 2011 and 2013. Fasir scored the equalizing goal in an acrobatic style in the 2014 AFC Challenge Cup bronze medal-winning match against Afghanistan.

Early life
Fasir was born on 4 September 1988 in Eydhafushi, Maldives and attended Baa Atoll Education Centre. Fasir was his parents'; Aishath Ali and Ahmed Shaheem's third child among the six. From the other children, four sons; Hussain Fasir, Mohamed Fasir, Ismail Fasir, Abdulla Fasir and daughter Fathimath Faiha, Mohamed Fasir was a former footballer who played with him during his early career times at Club Eagles and Club All Youth Linkage, until Mohamed suffered a serious injury which he took four years to recover completely.

Growing up in an island of Maldives, Fasir was an impressive player since a very young age and continued impressing the football spectators at school and island level until he was first offered by Club Eagles.

Club career

Club Eagles

2006 season
Fasir was first spotted by a Malé League team, Club Eagles during their training camp held at his home land Eydhafushi in 2006. Fasir was included in the three players Club Eagles offered the contract from Eydhafushi and he was later released at the end of the season as his contract got expired.

Club All Youth Linkage

2008 season
In the year 2007, Club All Youth Linkage, a second division team noticed Fasir during an island level football tournament held in Eydhafushi. Club AYL signed him for the 2008 season and Fasir played a major role to qualify and win the 2009 Dhivehi League play-off round as 2008 second division tournament finalists to qualify the club to Dhivehi League for the first time.

2009 season
Fasir played with the number 7 shirt this season and made his Dhivehi League debut in their first match of the 2009 season against VB Sports Club  on 6 February 2009. He also scored in the 3–2 win against VB on that day. On 21 February 2009, Fasir scored in the 2–2 draw against New Radiant. On 5 June 2009, Fasir scored two goals against Kalhaidhoo ZJ in their 8–1 win and also assisted Fauzan Habeeb to score their third goal of the game. Fasir scored his second goal against VB Sports club on 26 June 2009 and he also received his first yellow card in the Dhivehi League.

On 17 July 2009, Fasir made his Maldives FA Cup debut against Victory in the quarter finals but lost the game 2–1.

On 15 August 2009, Fasir assisted Santosh Sahukhala score in the injury time against New Radiant where they won 4–1. Club AYL went on to win against Kalhaidhoo 4–0 on 27 August 2009, with a goal from him and he also assisted Ju Manu Rai to score their second goal of the game.

As Club AYL finished the 2009 Dhivehi League at the fifth place in their debut season, they played all the matches in 2010 Dhivehi League play-off under the captaincy of Fasir.

Fasir scored against Vyansa on 2 October in their 4–1 win and also scored the winning goals against Kalhaidhoo ZJ on 8 October 2009 where they won 3–2 and against Club Valencia on 14 October where they won 2–1 to qualify to 2010 Dhivehi League as the winner of the 2010 Dhivehi League play-off.

The only match Fasir missed in the season was a league match against Victory, due to injury.

Club Valencia

2010 season
In January 2010, Fasir signed a one-year contract with Club Valencia receiving the number 7 shirt.

He made his debut on 26 March against New Radiant in the Dhivehi League and scored in the first minute to take the lead in a 4–1 defeat. On 16 May 2010, Fasir was brought down inside the Vyansa penalty area which awarded a penalty for Valencia, which was converted into a goal by Shamweel Qasim. He also scored the third goal of the game by himself in the same match which ended as a 3–0 win. On 23 May 2010, Fasir set up the first two goals which were scored by Ahmed Nashid in a 7–1 win against Thoddoo. On 27 May 2010, he set up the goal scored by Assadhulla Abdulla in a 1–1 draw against Vyansa. Fasir provided two assists to Ahmed Nashid in a 2–0 win against Club AYL on 4 June 2010. On 25 July 2010, Fasir scored two controversial solo goals, by beating three defenders in the first goal and beating one in the second against New Radiant in a 4–4 draw. On 24 August 2010, Fasir set up the only goal of the game in a 1–0 win against Maziya which was scored by Assad Abdul Ghanee. On 17 September 2010, Fasir scored his side's only goal against Thoddoo, after beating their goalkeeper. On 21 September 2010, Fasir set up the winning goal to Assadhulla Abdulla after beating the Club AYL goalkeeper in the 2–1 win.

On 30 September 2010, Fasir scored his first Maldives FA Cup goal against Maziya in the quarter finals, where the match ended as a 1–1 draw but Valencia won the penalties 3–1 with Fasir's kick hit the cross-bar.

The final league game against Vyansa was the only game he did not appear in the field in the 2010 season.

New Radiant

2011 season
Fasir signed to New Radiant on a one-year deal on 2011 and he was given the number 10 shirt.

Fasir made his debut to his new club against VB Sports Club in the opening match of 2011 Dhivehi League on 30 March 2011, scoring one and assisting one goal in a 3–2 defeat. On 9 April 2011, Fasir set up the first goal which was scored by Ahmed Thoriq and also scored the second goal himself in a 3–1 win against Clyb AYL. Fasir scored their side's only goal in the injury time of the second half from a penalty against Vyansa. He also received his first yellow card in the New Radiant shirt, in the same match on 16 April 2011. On 23 April 2011, Fasir scored against his former club Valencia in a 4–2 win. On 20 May 2011, Fasir scored against Victory from a free-kick in a 3–2 defeat. On 30 May 2011, Fasir scored his first hat-trick for the Blues, in a 5–0 win against Club AYL, where his second goal came from a penalty. Fasir assisted Ahmed Niyaz's goal and also scored a solo goal himself beating two defenders inside the penalty area to win the league match 3–1 against Vyansa on 12 June 2011. On 15 June 2011, Fasir scored his second hat-trick for New Radiant in a 7–0 win against Club Eagles. His first goal of the match was from a penalty which was rewarded when Eagles defender fouled Fasir in the penalty area in the first minute of the game. In the same game, he also assisted their second goal, which was scored by Wright Charles Gaye. On 24 June 2011, Fasir scored New Radiant's only goal from a penalty, which equalized the score which ended 1–1 in the full-time. On 11 September 2011, Fasir scored against Valencia in a 2–2 draw. Fasir scored his side's first two goals in a 6–1 win over Victory on 20 September 2011.

In an FA Cup quarter finals match against Eagles on 29 September 2011, Fasir scored their first goal from a penalty kick in a 2–1 win. Fasir made his President's Cup debut against Maziya in a 2–1 win on 16 October 2011 in the semifinal qualifier. In the third place play-off match of the FA Cup, Fasir scored the only goal against Victory where they lost 3–1.

Victory Sports Club

2012 season

On 13 November 2011, he signed a one-year contract with Victory Sports Club. He was given the vacated number 7 shirt worn by Mukhthar Naseer during the 2011 season.

Fasir spent most of the 2012 season out of football due to a fibula fracture in the practice match between the national team and New Radiant. He was expected to return in five months but he started practice with Victory in exact 6 months. After recovering from the injury, Fasir made his debut for Victory against Club Valencia after a month of practice, in a league match on 12 August 2012, coming on for Fauzan Habeeb at the start of second half. It just took two minutes for him to score his first goal for Victory with his first touch on the ball. In the same match, he also set up a goal for Hnsley Awilo where they won the match 8–2.

On 13 September 2012, he started his first match for the club in an FA Cup quarter finals match against Valencia, where he scored the game's first match in the 4–2 win. On 17 September 2012, Fasir again scored the games' first goal after beating the goalkeeper in a 4–2 win against Club AYL. Fasir scored in a 5–0 win against Club Eagles on 22 September 2012 again, by beating the opponent goalkeeper. On 1 October 2012, Fasir scored the only goal of the game to win three points for his side against Maziya. Fasir assisted the opening goal of the match scored by Hansley Awilo in a 5–2 win against VB Addu FC on 5 October 2012.

On 15 October 2012, Fasir played in the President's Cup final against his former club New Radiant, coming in to play for Hassan Adhuham in the second half. The match ended goalless for 120 minutes and ended as runners-up as they lost the penalty shoot-out 2–1. Fasir's penalty went over the cross-bar.

Return to New Radiant

2013 season
On 16 November 2012, Fasir completed his return to the club and signed a one-year contract and claimed the number 5 shirt.

Fasir made his New Radiant return debut in his first ever Charity Shield match against Maziya in a 3–1 win, on 21 February 2013. On 26 February 2013, he scored his first goal of his second spell against VB Addu FC in a 10–1 win. Fasir made his AFC Cup debut in a 1–0 home win against Sun Hei in New Radiant's first game of the 2013 AFC Cup group stage. He scored twice in the 5–0 league win against Club Valencia on 24 March 2013. Fasir scored his first continental goal in a 3–1 home win against Yangon United in an AFC Cup group stage match on 9 April 2013. He also assisted Sylla Mansah's goal in the same match. On 24 April 2013, Fasir scored the first two goals against Sun Hei in a 3–0 win in the AFC Cup group stage match at the Mong Kok Stadium.

In an AFC Cup Round of 16 match against Selangor at home, Fasir scored in the crucial 2–0 win in the extra time on 15 May 2013, sending the team into the quarter-finals of the AFC Cup. On 24 May 2013, Fasir scored against Maziya in a 2–0 victory. Fasir assisted Ali Ashfaq against Club Eagles in a 5–0 win on 10 June 2013 and also in the following match against VB Addu FC in a 2–0 win on 14 June 2013. On 19 June 2013, Fasir scored against his former club Victory in a 3–0 win. On 30 June 2013, Fasir scored against Club AYL in a controversial 10–0 win. Fasir scored twice in the 7–0 win against Club Eagles on 20 July 2013. On 28 July 2013, Fasir set up the only goal in the last match of the 2013 Dhivehi League, scored by Mohamed Umair making it possible for the team to finish the league as champions with a 100% winning record.

On 17 September 2013, Fasir scored against Al-Kuwait in a 7–2 home defeat in the AFC Cup quarter-finals first leg. He scored in the FA Cup semi-finals match against Club Eagles in a 3–0 win on 30 September 2013.

On 27 November 2013, New Radiant former coach Velizar Popov showed interest to sign Fasir along with Akram Abdul Ghanee to his Sur Sports Club of Oman Professional League and an official loan request was received by New Radiant on 8 December 2013. New Radiant decided to release both players but later New Radiant decided to cancel the loan transfer due to the financial situation in the Sur Sports Club.

2014 season
On 30 November 2013, New Radiant announced on their official website that Fasir signed a new contract with the club, keeping him at the club until 2015. On 9 January 2014, club appointed Fasir as the third-captain of New Radiant Sports Club. He was given the number 11 shirt for the new season, which was personally sponsored by the former New Radiant chairman, Ibrahim Nooraddeen.

He was nominated for the 2013 Haveeru Sports Awards for the best player and ended at fourth, with 870 points.

Fasir scored his first goal of the season in the Charity Shield match against Maziya
in a 3–1 win on 10 June 2014. He scored his first league goal against Club AYL, on 16 June 2014 in a 7–0 win. In the same match, he also assisted the first goal of the match which was scored by Escobedo Carmona Manuel David. On 7 July 2014, Fasir scored twice in the 4–0 win against Mahibadhoo. Fasir scored twice and also assisted Ibrahim Fazeel's goal against Club Eagles in a 4–1 win on 14 July 2014. On 20 July 2014, Fasir set up two goals, which were scored by Mohamed Umair and Shamweel Qasim, and scored one goal himself in a 3–0 win against Club Valencia. On 28 July 2014, Fasir scored his first hat-trick of the season against BG Sports Club in a 6–0 victory. Fasir missed the last game of the Dhivehi League between the rivals Maziya due to suspension for receiving two yellow cards.

On 21 August 2014, Fasir scored his 50th Dhivehi League goal against Club Valencia, with a beautiful lob over the goalkeeper. On 30 September 2014, in a 5–1 win against BG Sports Club, Fasir scored twice where his second came from a penalty. In an FA Cup quarter-finals match against Mahibadhoo, Fasir scored their side's first two goals; second goal from a free-kick, and set up the third and fourth goal which were scored by Escobedo Carmona Manuel David and Akram Abdul Ghanee, in a 6–3 win on 14 October 2014. Disciplinary actions were taken against Fasir, along with teammates Mohamed Rasheed and Hamza Mohamed for playing in an Eid al-Adha football tournament in his island Eydhafushi and failing to report to club training after the Eid break. Due to this, he was suspended for the last game of Dhivehi League second round match against Mahibadhoo and was also demanded for a public apology.

On 22 October 2014, Fasir scored an absolute screamer, to win three points against Club Valencia in the last second of the game, where they won the match 2–1. On 26 October 2014, Fasir scored the game's only goal against Victory, to win their side another three points. On 5 November 2014, Fasir scored five goals against Mahibadhoo in a 6–1 victory, where he scored his last goal from the spot. In the same match, he was brought down in the penalty box by a Mahibadhoo player, from which he faced a major injury, which costed him the season's Golden Boot to Assadhulla Abdulla. According to the CT scan reports, it showed no fracture but muscle pain due to his previous injury occurred in 2012 during the national team practice.

After the injury, Fasir started joining the practice sessions with New Radiant on 17 November 2014 and made his first appearance after injury against Maziya on 23 November 2014 in a 2–1 win, coming in for Hamza Mohamed with 8 minutes remaining for the final whistle in the President's Cup final qualifier. On 30 November 2014, Fasir came in for Ahmed Niyaz in the 53rd minute of the President's Cup final and scored the winning goal in the 106th minute against Club Eagles, to win the President's Cup for the third time in a row for New Radiant.

After the end of the season, Fasir underwent a minor surgery to take off a plate which was inserted in 2012 to support his leg due to an injury suffered during a national team practice match.

2015 season
On 11 January 2015, club announced Fasir as their new vice-captain, and was handed the number 7 jersey worn by legend Ali Ashfaq, which was vacated following his departure since 2014.

He finished as the runner-up to Assadhulla Abdulla for the 2014 Haveeru Sports Awards best player.

Fasir made his season debut on 15 April 2015, against Ayeyawady United in the AFC Cup group stage match, coming in for Rilwan Waheed in the 75th minute at the Thuwunna Stadium where the match ended goalless. On 20 April 2015, Fasir made his Dhivehi Premier League debut in the 56th minute, replacing Ahmed Niyaz and scored in the last second of the injury time, helping his team giving a score line of 3–1 against Victory. This goal hardly managed to maintain his record of scoring in his first league match of each season, since 2009.

International career

Maldives under-23 team
Fasir was called up for the Maldives national under-23 football team for the first time, for the 2010 South Asian Games held in Dhaka. He made his debut in their first game against Bhutan as a second-half substitute, where they won the match 1–0, on 30 January 2010. He started his first game for the under-23 side against Bangladesh in a 1–0 defeat in the last group stage match, on 3 February 2010. Fasir also featured in the tournament's third place play-off match, where they won the bronze after beating India 3–1 on penalties after a goalless 90 minutes. Fasir was also called up for the 2010 Asian Games held in Guangzhou later that year, but was an unused substitute throughout the tournament.

On 18 November 2013, the Football Association of Maldives chose Fasir to play in the 2013 MNC Cup (an invitational friendly tournament) when Ali Ashfaq refused to play for the under-23 side as one of the three over-aged players. He played in the tournament and scored in a 1–0 win against Papua New Guinea and also in the 2–1 defeat against Indonesia. Maldives won bronze medal in the invitational friendly tournament.

Maldives senior team
Fasir made his debut for the Maldives senior side on 12 October 2010, in an international friendly against Indonesia replacing Ali Ashfaq in the second half injury time, where they lost 3–0 at the Siliwangi Stadium. Fasir started his first game for Maldives on 24 November 2011 in a 2–1 friendly win against Seychelles at the Rasmee Dhandu Stadium.

Fasir was an un-used substitute in the 2014 FIFA World Cup qualification second round both legs against Iran, and also in the 2011 Indian Ocean Island Games which were played in the mid-2011. He was called up for the major regional tournament SAFF Championship for the first time, in 2011's edition and featured in the last group stage match against Bangladesh in a 3–1 win, replacing Ibrahim Fazeel in the 80th minute at the Jawaharlal Nehru Stadium, Delhi on 6 December 2011.

Fasir spent most of the 2012 season out of football due to a fibula fracture in the practice match between the national team and New Radiant, when New Radiant goalkeeper Imran Mohamed and Fasir both went for the ball and he twisted his ankle, on 2 February 2012. He missed the 2012 AFC Challenge Cup and 2012 Nehru Cup due to the injury.

Fasir was included in the 2013 SAFF Championship in Kathmandu, and played his first full match in their first game in a sensational 10–0 win against Sri Lanka on 2 September 2013. In the same game, he also scored his first goal for the national side. In their second game against Bhutan, on his birthday; 4 September 2013, he scored a brace in an 8–2 win. Fasir also made two assists for Ali Ashfaq in the same game.

On 13 May 2014, Fasir scored twice, in an exhibition game against Laos. Fasir was selected in the 2014 AFC Challenge Cup and played his first game against Myanmar, in a 3–2 defeat. In the third place play-off match, he scored the precious game equalizer; 1–1 against Afghanistan from a side bicycle kick in the 118th minute, where they won the bronze after winning the penalty shootout but unfortunately his spot kick went wide.

Playing style
Fasir has good finishing, pace, dribbling, positioning and crossing ability. He is able to play on wither wing as well through the center of the pitch, making him a versatile attacker. Although Fasir is right footed, He is also able to control the ball and cross and finish well with his left foot. He occasionally plays as an attacking midfielder.

Outside football

Personal life
Fasir married to a former radio host at Dhi FM Aishath Aboobakuru on 26 December 2013, divorcing in 2016.

Commercial endorsements
On 19 September 2017, Litus Automobiles unveiled Fasir as their brand ambassador. Under the ambassadorship program he will feature in the advertisements, which includes TV commercials, billboards, posters and events conducted by Litus Automobiles.

Career statistics

Club

International

* Played as aged over 23 years.

International goals

Under–23

Scores and results list Maldives U–23's goal tally first.

Senior team

Scores and results list the Maldives goal tally first.
≠ Match not considered a full A-international by FIFA but it is for the Maldives FA.

International appearances

Under–23
Result list in Maldives home for all games

Senior team
Result list in Maldives home for all games
≠ Match not considered a full A-international by FIFA but it is for the Maldives FA.

Awards and honours

Club
Club AYL
Second Division: Runner-up 2008

New Radiant
FA Charity Shield: 2013, 2014; Runner-up 2015
Dhivehi League/Dhivehi Premier League: 2013, 2014, 2015, 2017
Malé League: 2018
Maldives FA Cup: 2013, 2017; Runner-up 2014
President's Cup: 2013, 2014, 2017; Runner-up 2011, 2015

Victory
Dhivehi League: Runner-up 2012 
President's Cup: Runner-up 2012

TC Sports
Dhivehi Premier League: Runner-up 2016
Maldives FA Cup: Runner-up 2016
President's Cup: Runner-up 2016

International
Maldives under-23
South Asian Games
Bronze: 2010

MNC Cup
Bronze: 2013

Maldives
AFC Challenge Cup
Bronze: 2014
SAFF Championship
Gold: 2018

Individual
Haveeru Maldivian Footballer of the year: Runner-up 2014
New Radiant Excellence Award: 2013
Maldives Football Awards Best Player: 2016, 2017
Maldives Football Awards Golden Shoe: 2016 (34 goals), 2017 (24 goals)
Mihaaru Awards Football Player of the year: 2017; Runner-up 2018
Mihaaru Awards Golden Shoe: 2017 (24 goals – 47 points)

References

External links 

 
 2015 national team suspension

1988 births
Living people
Maldivian footballers
Maldives international footballers
Club Valencia players
New Radiant S.C. players
Victory Sports Club players
Association football wingers
Association football forwards
Footballers at the 2010 Asian Games
South Asian Games medalists in football
Asian Games competitors for the Maldives
Club Eagles players